Kuiya orai is a village near Orai station in Uttar Pradesh State in India. A national highway passes through it.

Kishorilalji bjp district Maha Sachiv belongs to the village.

Villages in Jalaun district
Orai